Yves Michel (18 July 1920 – 15 November 1983) was a French politician.

Michel was the mayor of Plouescat from 1971 to 1976. After the death of Antoine Caill, Michel completed Caill's term in the National Assembly, serving as a deputy from 1976 to 1978. Michel did not run for reelection and the seat was filled by Charles Miossec.

References

1920 births
1983 deaths
Deputies of the 5th National Assembly of the French Fifth Republic
Mayors of places in Brittany